The Lords Justices were appointed by George I while he was away, in Germany, in the capacity of Elector of Hanover.

William Wake, Archbishop of Canterbury;
Evelyn Pierrepont, 1st Duke of Kingston-upon-Hull, Lord President of the Council;
Henry Grey, 1st Duke of Kent, Lord Privy Seal;
John Campbell, 2nd Duke of Argyll, Lord Steward of the Household;
Thomas Pelham-Holles, 1st Duke of Newcastle, Lord Chamberlain;
Charles Paulet, 2nd Duke of Bolton;
John Churchill, 1st Duke of Marlborough, Captain General;
John Ker, 1st Duke of Roxburghe, Secretary of State for Scotland;
Charles Spencer, 3rd Earl of Sunderland, First Commissioner of the Treasury and Groom of the Stool;
James Berkeley, 3rd Earl of Berkeley, First Commissioner of the Admiralty;
James Stanhope, 1st Earl Stanhope, Secretary of State for the Northern Department;
James Craggs the Younger, Secretary of State for the Southern Department.

References

George I of Great Britain
1719 in Great Britain